Happy Raikoti  is an Indian singer , lyricist and actor associated with Punjabi music. He made his singing debut with the song "Jaan" in 2014. His album "7 Knaalan" was released in 2015. Recently he has appeared in the movie Teshan. He is one of leading lyricists in Punjabi Music .

Discography

As lead artist

Popular singles as lyricist

Lyricist in movies

Punjabi

Hindi

References

External links 

 

Punjabi-language singers
Punjabi music
Living people
Punjabi people
Bhangra (music) musicians
Indian male singers
Indian lyricists
1992 births
People from Ludhiana district
Musicians from Ludhiana